Veenaavaadanam is an experimental Indian documentary film entirely shot in a cell phone camera in Malayalam language duration with 28.23 minutes'. The documentary released in 2008 and Nokia N70 music edition mobile phone was used for the film and it is now considered as the first Indian movie which shot on a cell phone camera. Sathish Kalathil is the Writer and director of the movie.

Plot 
The documentary narrates about world paintings and painters through a conversation with a painter, Sujith Aalungal and introduce his 'Veenaavaadanam' painting.

Crew 
The documentary was Produced by Kalathil Creative Heads and edited in S And S Media, Chennai by Vahid Kochukadavu and Sathish Kalathil. Music done by Babuji and lyric written by Sathish Kalathil, sung and narrated by Dr. B. Jayakrishnan.

Releasing 
This film was released in 16mm screen used with digital projector on 20 July 2008 at Hotel Elite International, Thrissur and the film was certified by Indian Central Board of Film Certification On 25 September 2008 . It was telecast ed in T.C.V channel  On 5 June 2010.

References

External links 

 
 Official Website

Mobile phone films
2008 films
Indian documentary films
Films shot in Thrissur
Indian avant-garde and experimental films